Wicked Tinkers is the debut album released by Wicked Tinkers.

Musicians
Aaron Shaw
John MacAdams
Warren Casey

Track listing 
The Bird Set
Hugh Ross Set
Seal Set
Strathspey & reel
The Odd Set
The Ferret Set
Wallop The Cat
6/8 Marches
The Pumpkin's Fancy
A Flame of Wrath
Aaron's Set
Roasty Set
Fiollaigean
Hornpipe/jig Set

Credits
Produced by Thistle Pricks Productions & Wicked Tinkers 
  
Recorded by Shep Lonsdale. 
Assistant recording engineer: June Murakawa. 
Bagpipe recording assistant: Bill Doebler. 
Small pipes loaned by Eric Rigler. 
  
Recorded at Castle Oaks Productions, Calabasas, CA, 
and Kaboom Studios, Santa Monica, CA. 
  
Mixed by Shep Lonsdale at Kaboom Studios, Santa Monica, CA. 
  
Mastered by Brian Gardner at Bernie Grundman Mastering, Hollywood, CA. 
  
Art Direction: Warren Casey 
Design & Production: James Suelflow 
Photography: Evan Hurd 
Copy Editor: Jim Hull

Reviews
"If my car suddenly acquired one of those earthshaking sound systems that vibrates windows for a block in each direction, this might be the first CD I'd play. There's nothing subtle, or serious, about these guys—just three smiling lads from California with a set of Highland bagpipes and assorted drums, having a lot of fun blasting away on an assortment of traditional and modern Scottish jigs, reels, hornpipes, and marches. A percussive wall of sound from snare and tenor drums and a booming Macedonian bass tappan reinforce Aaron Shaw's turbocharged piping on most tracks, with a couple of slow airs thrown in for a breather. Highly recommended for anyone who likes Scottish pipes and drums played with skill and power, or who just wants to scare off the neighbors." 
[www.dirtylinen.com]T.J. McGrath -- © Dirty Linen, Ltd. All rights reserved

1999 debut albums
Wicked Tinkers albums